The Hong Kong Film Award for Best Original Film Score is an award presented annually at the Hong Kong Film Awards for a film with the best original music score.  the current winner is Eman Lam for My Prince Edward.

Winners and nominees

References

External links
 Hong Kong Film Awards Official Site

Hong Kong Film Awards